Auguste Levêque (1866 – 1921) was a Belgian painter influenced both by realism and symbolism. Levêque was also a sculptor, poet and art theoretician.

Levêque was born in Nivelles, Walloon Brabant. He studied under Jean-François Portaels at the Académie Royale des Beaux-Arts in Brussels, and received the Prix Godecharle for his painting Job in 1890.

Levêque was a member of the "Salon d'Art Idéaliste", formed by Jean Delville in Brussels in 1896, which is considered the Belgian equivalent to the Parisian Rose & Cross Salon. Other members of the group were  Léon Frédéric, Albert Ciamberlani, Constant Montald, Emile Motte, Victor Rousseau, Armand Point and Alexandre Séon. The Salon was abandoned in 1898. He died in Saint-Josse-ten-Noode.

Notable paintings
Job
Les Dentelles d'airain
Panthéra et Vipérena
Mater dolorosa
Circé
Dante
Parque
Repos
Ouvriers tragiques
Triomphe de la Mort
Moisson future
Hymne d'Amour
Repos de Diane
Combat de Centaures
Portrait d'Edmond Picard (I)
Portrait d'Edmond Picard (II)

Notable sculptures

Fin de Sodome
Triomphe de la Vigne
Combat d'amazones
Vision païenne

References

Sources
 P. & V. Berko, "Dictionary of Belgian painters born between 1750 & 1875", Knokke 1981, pp. 422–423.

External links

Dictionnaire des peintres belges (in french)

1866 births
1921 deaths
People from Nivelles
19th-century Belgian painters
19th-century Belgian male artists
20th-century Belgian painters
20th-century Belgian male artists